Victoria Mavridou (born July 8, 1991 in Thessaloniki) is a Greek weightlifter. At age seventeen, Mavridou made her official debut as the nation's lone female weightlifter for the 2008 Summer Olympics in Beijing, where she competed in the women's super heavyweight category (+75 kg). She placed ninth in this event, as she successfully lifted 105 kg in the single-motion snatch, and hoisted 126 kg in a two-part, shoulder-to-overhead clean and jerk, for a total of 231 kg.

References

External links
 NBC 2008 Olympics profile 

1991 births
Living people
Greek female weightlifters
Olympic weightlifters of Greece
Weightlifters at the 2008 Summer Olympics
Sportspeople from Thessaloniki
21st-century Greek women